The Haval Big Dog is a compact crossover SUV produced by the Chinese manufacturer Great Wall Motor under the Haval brand since 2020.

Its Chinese-language name "大狗" (Dàgǒu), means "Big Dog", was chosen by the Chinese public in a poll written out by Haval in China. The body colors and trim levels are also named after dog breeds, starting from the entry 'Husky' trim level up to the top 'Belgian Shepherd' trim.



First generation (2020)

The Haval Big Dog was unveiled at the 2020 Chengdu Auto Show, and it is a crossover, offered with both front-wheel-drive and four-wheel-drive drivetrain. 
Despite the Big Dog being the successor of the Haval H5, the Big Dog is a crossover SUV built on the unibody Lemon platform shared with the third generation Haval H6 and Haval Jolion instead of the older Haval H5's body-on-frame platform. 
The Big Dog uses a transversely mounted engine, and it uses McPherson suspension for the front axle and multi-link suspension for the rear axle.

The former is only offered in front-wheel-drive, while the latter is only offered in four-wheel-drive. The Big Dog also offers a variety of driving modes and off-road specifications and features such as two differential locks, tank U-turn, and Computer-controlled four-wheel drive.

The Big Dog is available with a choice of six exterior colours: Orange, Red, Grey, Green, Black and White; and three rim packages: Five spoke star 19 inch, Double five spoke wind turbine 18 inch and Five spoke drill 18 inch. 
Four interior options are also available: Black, Blue-Green, Rice-Brown and Black-Orange. Pricing currently ranges between 119,900 yuan and 142,900 yuan with four trim levels (17,925 USD to 21,360 USD - November 2020 exchange rate).

Big Dog Hunting Edition

In 2022, the company announced the new Big Dog Hunting Edition. The Hunting Edition features a more rugged appearance with redesigned bumpers, a restyled grille, larger wheels, running boards, and extra wide wheel arch extensions with exposed bolts.

Oversea markets

The Haval Dargo is the name for the Big Dog for oversea markets. The Dargo is available in 2 trims, Sport and Adventure, and is powered by a 2.0-litre 4-cylinder engine.

Second generation (2023)

The second generation Big Dog was originally previewed as the Haval H-Dog PHEV at the 2022 Guangzhou Auto Show that opened on December 30, 2022, available in both gasoline and PHEV versions. The interior sports a symmetrical design with a full LCD instrument panel and a central control screen. The second generation Big Dog is a larger and more expensive car compared to the first generation, while the first generation Big Dog will continue to be sold alongside the Second Generation Big Dog.

The second generation Haval Big Dog or H-Dog PHEV uses a 1.5-litre turbo four-cylinder engine plus 2-speed DHT powertrain that outputs a combined 240 kW (326 hp) and 530 Nm with a pure electric cruising range of 50 to 150 km. It is equipped with a Borg-Warner electronically controlled four-wheel drive system, 2 differential locks, and 9 all-terrain modes. Haval claims the fuel consumption of the second generation Haval Big Dog is 1.85 litre per 100 kilometers for a cruising range of 1,000 kilometers. The gasoline version is equipped with a 2.0-litre turbo four-cylinder gasoline engine with a maximum output of 175 kW (238 hp), mated to an 8-speed automatic transmission. The entry level version comes with front-wheel drive and the high-end trim levels are available with four-wheel drive.

References

External links

Official website

Big Dog
Cars of China
2020s cars
Cars introduced in 2020
Compact sport utility vehicles
Crossover sport utility vehicles
All-wheel-drive vehicles